Goodland is an unincorporated community in Bailey County, in the U.S. state of Texas. According to the Handbook of Texas, the community had a population of 10 in 2000.

History
Goodland was founded in 1924 when the McKeloey brothers moved to the area from Fort Worth and sold their ranch. It was given the name Goodland because of the high hopes of local settlers. The community thrived as a ranching community but continued to thrive when farmers started growing sunflowers, wheat, sorghum, grain, and cotton. It had three stores and 50 residents in 1940. It grew to 65 in 1980 and gained a post office, a store, a cotton gin, and a grain elevator. The population went down to 25 in 1990 and continued to shrink to 10 in 2000 and remained there in 2010.

Geography

Education
Goodland is served by the Sudan Independent School District.

References

Unincorporated communities in Bailey County, Texas
Unincorporated communities in Texas